Michael Paradžiković (born 9 January 1992) is a Croatian former professional footballer who played as a goalkeeper.

Club career
Paradžiković started his career playing at youth level for Cibalia, where he signed a professional three-year contract in November 2010. He made his debut for the first team on 13 August 2011 in a 4–1 defeat to Slaven Belupo. At the end of August, he was loaned to Druga HNL side Marsonia 1909 where he was featured in only two games before returning to Cibalia in January 2012.

References

External links
 
 

1992 births
Living people
People from Reutlingen
Croatian footballers
Footballers from Baden-Württemberg
Association football goalkeepers
Croatia youth international footballers
Croatian Football League players
HNK Cibalia players